The National Women's Political Caucus (NWPC), or the Caucus, describes itself as a multi-partisan grassroots organization in the United States dedicated to recruiting, training, and supporting women who seek elected and appointed offices at all levels of government. The Caucus offers training, technical assistance, and advice for political candidates, campaign managers, and trainers, with state and local chapters providing support to candidates running at state and local levels by helping raise money and providing hands-on volunteer assistance.

History

The NWPC was founded on July 10, 1971, to increase the number of women in all aspects of political life – as elected and appointed officials, as judges in state and federal courts, and as delegates to national conventions. On that date, 320 women from all over the United States met in Washington, D.C., to found the NWPC. The founders included Bella Abzug, Shirley Chisholm, Betty Friedan, Fannie Lou Hamer, Mildred Jeffrey, Florynce Kennedy, Jill Ruckelshaus, Ruth E. Shinn, and Gloria Steinem, among others. The founders elected a national policy council, initially co-chaired by Bella Abzug and Republican Virginia Allan; Allan was the former chair of President Richard Nixon's Task Force on Women's Rights and Responsibilities. At the founding meeting, Steinem delivered an Address to the Women of America, in which she characterized feminism as a "revolution" that meant striving for a society free of racism and sexism; the speech, delivered at the height of the women's movement, became a milestone in U.S. female oratory.

The NWPC held its first convention in Houston from February 9 to 11, 1973. The NWPC created a Democratic Task Force in 1974 and a Republican Task force in 1975.

Leadership
The President of NWPC is Donna Lent. The 1st Vice President & Vice President of Communications is Deidre Malone. The Program Director is Alexa DeJesus.

Activities

The NWPC organizes campaign workshops across the country to teach the nuts and bolts of running a successful candidacy at all levels of government. The Caucus Political Planning Committee vets women candidates for endorsement and the political action committee raises money to support endorsed candidates with campaign contributions. The Caucus also offers workshops on political appointments and collaborates with other women's political organizations to promote viable women candidates for gubernatorial and presidential appointments to key posts within the government.

The NWPC has state and local caucuses in communities across the country to help identify candidates, needs and issues specific to their state or county. State caucuses currently include Arizona, California, Florida, Georgia, Indiana, Kentucky, Massachusetts, Maryland, Missouri, New Jersey, New York, Ohio, Tennessee, Texas, and Washington.

References

External links
Official NWPC site with list of state and local caucuses
Audiotape collection of the National Women's Political Caucus (U.S.), 1977-2000. Schlesinger Library, Radcliffe Institute, Harvard University.
Videotape and motion picture collection of the National Women's Political Caucus (U.S.), 1981-2003. Schlesinger Library, Radcliffe Institute, Harvard University.
 : National Women's Political Caucus papers , Rare Books, Special Collections, and Preservation, River Campus Libraries, University of Rochester

Liberal feminist organizations
Political organizations based in the United States

Women's organizations based in the United States